The National Communications and Media Commission of Iraq (NCMC) was established in 2004 to monitor media and communications in Iraq.

See also 
 .iq
 Ministry of Communications (Iraq)

References

External links 
 

Communications in Iraq
Internet in Iraq
Government agencies of Iraq